Hydroptilinae is a subfamily of microcaddisflies in the family Hydroptilidae. There are at least 60 genera and 1,600 described species in Hydroptilinae.

The type genus for Hydroptilinae is Hydroptila J.W. Dalman, 1819.

Genera
These 65 genera belong to the subfamily Hydroptilinae:

 Abtrichia Mosely, 1939 i c g
 Acanthotrichia Wells, 1982 i c g
 Acostatrichia Mosely, 1939 i c g
 Acritoptila Wells, 1982 i c g
 Agraylea Curtis, 1834 i c g b
 Alisotrichia Flint, 1964 i c g
 Anchitrichia Flint, 1970 i c g
 Ascotrichia Flint, 1983 i c g
 Austratrichia Wells, 1982 i c g
 Betrichia Mosely, 1939 i c g
 Bredinia Flint, 1968 i c g
 Byrsopteryx Flint, 1981 i c g
 Caledonotrichia Sykora, 1967 i c g
 Catoxyethira Ulmer, 1912 i c g
 Celaenotrichia Mosely, 1934 i c g
 Cerasmatrichia Flint, Harris & Botosaneanu, 1994 i c g
 Ceratotrichia Flint in Quintero & Aiello, 1992 i c g
 Chrysotrichia Schmid, 1958 i c g
 Costatrichia Mosely, 1937 i c g
 Cyclopsiella Kjaerandsen, 1997 i c g
 Dhatrichia Mosely, 1948 i c g
 Dibusa Ross, 1939 i c g
 Dicaminus Mueller, 1879 i c g
 Eutonella Mueller, 1921 i c g
 Flintiella Angrisano, 1995 i c g
 Hellyethira Neboiss, 1977 i c g
 Hydroptila Dalman, 1819 i c g b
 Hydroptilina Martynov, 1934 i c g
 Ithytrichia Eaton, 1873 i c g
 Jabitrichia Wells, 1990 i c g
 Kumanskiella Harris & Flint, 1992 i c g
 Leucotrichia Mosely, 1934 i c g
 Macrostactobia Schmid, 1958 i c g
 Mayatrichia Mosely, 1937 i c g
 Maydenoptila Neboiss, 1977 i c g
 Mejicanotrichia Harris & Holzenthal, 1997 i c g
 Metrichia Ross, 1938 i c g
 Microptila Ris, 1897 i c g
 Missitrichia Wells, 1991 i c g
 Mulgravia Wells, 1982 i c g
 Neotrichia Morton, 1905 i c g
 Niuginitrichia Wells, 1990 i c g
 Nothotrichia Flint, 1967 i c g
 Ochrotrichia Mosely, 1934 i c g b
 Orphninotrichia Mosely, 1934 i c g
 Orthotrichia Eaton, 1873 i c g
 Oxyethira Eaton, 1873 i c g b
 Parastactobia Schmid, 1958 i c g
 Paroxyethira Mosely, 1924 i c g
 Paucicalcaria Mathis & Bowles, 1989 i c g
 Peltopsyche Mueller, 1879 i c g
 Plethus Hagen, 1887 i c g
 Rhyacopsyche Mueller, 1879 i c g
 Scelobotrichia Harris & Bueno-Soria, 1993 i c g
 Scelotrichia Ulmer, 1951 i c g
 Stactobia McLachlan, 1880 i c g
 Stactobiella Martynov, 1924 i c g
 Tangatrichia Wells & Andersen, 1995 i c g
 Taraxitrichia Flint & Harris, 1991 i c g
 Tricholeiochiton Kloet & Hincks, 1944 i c g
 Ugandatrichia Mosely, 1939 i c g
 Vietrichia Olah, 1989 i c g
 Wlitrichia Kjaerandsen, 1997 i c g
 Xuthotrichia Mosely, 1934 i c g
 Zumatrichia Mosely, 1937 i c g

Data sources: i = ITIS, c = Catalogue of Life, g = GBIF, b = Bugguide.net

References

Further reading

External links

 

Hydroptilidae
Articles created by Qbugbot